Mara is a Romanian supermarket chain operating 2 supermarkets in Focşani.

External links 
 Mara Supermarket

Supermarkets of Romania